Funny may refer to:
Humour
Comic strip, also known as funny pages
 "Funny", by Scars on Broadway from Scars on Broadway (album), 2008
 "Funny" (Chase & Status song), 2015
 "Funny" (Zedd and Jasmine Thompson song), 2020